The University of Louisville Cardinal Singers is a choir consisting of between 29-40 members, and is the most selective choral ensemble at the University of Louisville in Kentucky.

History
The Cardinal Singers were founded in 1970 under the name University Singers by the late William C. Lathon, former University of Louisville professor in the Schools of Music and Education, as an outreach organization for the University of Louisville.  In 1980 they were appointed by then Governor John Y. Brown, Jr. as Commonwealth of Kentucky "ambassadors of good will." Mr. Lathon conducted the ensemble until 1991, when Shirley Wilkinson, long-time Jefferson County Public Schools (Kentucky) choral director, took over the leadership of the Singers.  Dr. Kent Hatteberg began conducting the ensemble in 1997, and the name was changed to "Cardinal Singers" in 1998 to include the school's mascot.  The ensemble rehearses twice weekly, and students receive a half credit for participation.

The outreach mission of the Cardinal Singers continues as a focus today, and the Singers have made a number of appearances nationally and internationally participating in competitions, seminars, and benefits.

Performances, awards and events

11th International Choir Competition, Zadar, Croatia 2018
Top score (95/100), Abbess Čika’s Golden Cross
Grand Prix of the City of Zadar winner
Special award for best program
Xi'an International Choral Festival, Xi'an, China 2017
Harmonie-Festival- Lindenholzhausen, Germany 2017
First Prize in mixed choir category
Second Prize in sacred music category, special prize for best program
Second Prize in folk music category
Gotham SINGS! Collegiate Choral Showcase at Carnegie Hall, New York, New York 2017
ACDA National Conference, Minneapolis, Minnesota 2017
China International Chorus Festival, Beijing, 2016
ACDA Southern Division Conference, Chattanooga, Tennessee 2016
NCCO National Conference, Portland, Oregon 2015
Taipei International Choral Festival, Taiwan 2015
Singapore International Choral Festival, Singapore 2015
Malmgren Concert Series at Syracuse University, Syracuse, NY 2014
Sing'n'Joy Louisville host choir and festival choir, Louisville, Kentucky 2013
Vietnam International Choir Competition, Vietnam 2013
Hội An Choir Grand Prize
Gold Diploma, Category winners in Mixed
Gold Diploma, Category winners in Folklore
Gold Diploma, Category winners in Sacred
Yeosu International Choir Competition and Festival, South Korea 2013
Overall Grand Prize
First place Mixed choirs category
First place Sacred category
Second place Pop/Jazz category
Second place Folk/Gospel/Spiritual category
Best Conductor Award (Dr. Kent Hatteberg)
ACDA National Conference, Dallas, Texas 2013
U.S./Cuba Choral Summit, Cuba 2012
INTERKULTUR World Rankings as of April, 2012
No. 1 Overall
No. 1 Mixed Choir
No. 6 Pop, Jazz, and Gospel
ACDA Southern Division Conference, Winston-Salem, North Carolina 2012
NCCO National Conference, Fort Collins, Colorado 2011
International Choir Days Mainhausen, Germany 2011
First Prize in jazz choirs category
Men of Cardinal Singers, First Prize in male choir category
Second Prize in mixed choirs category
 International Chamber Choir Competition Marktoberdorf, Germany 2011
Second Prize
Gustave Charlier-Anna Maroye-prize for the best interpretation of a religious choral work
Harmonie-Festival- Lindenholzhausen, Germany 2011
First Prize in mixed choir category
Women of Cardinal Singers, Second Prize in female chamber choir category
Men of Cardinal Singers, Third Prize in male chamber choir category
Taipei International Choral Festival, Taiwan 2010
Beijing International Choral Festival, China 2010
INTERKULTUR (World Choir Games) 2010
First Prize in Mixed Choirs
Second Place for MUSICA MUNDI World Ranking List Top 1.000
Grand Prix of Choral Music - Busan, South Korea 2009
First Prize in Sacred Competition
First Prize in Mixed Chamber Choir Competition
ACDA Southern Division Conference: Headliner Concert - March 2008
Voices of the Baltics Conference - Seminar Choir - Tallinn, Estonia 2007
Tolosa Choral Contest - Tolosa, Spain 2006
Women of Cardinal Singers, Third Prize in Profane Category
Women of Cardinal Singers, Third Prize in Sacred Category
Cardinal Singers, Third Prize in Folklore Category
World Symposium on Choral Music – Kyoto, Japan 2005
Harmonie-Festival– Lindenholzhausen, Germany 2005
First Prize in the mixed chamber choir category
Preis des Bundestagspräsidenten der Bundesrepublik Deutschland – for the highest score of all choirs.
Award for outstanding interpretation of world premier: Laudate pueri, Dominum by Vitautas Miškinis.
International Chamber Choir Competition– Marktoberdorf, Germany 2005.
Second Prize
Conductor's prize for the best interpretation of a contemporary choral work: "Ich bin das Brot des Lebens" by Wolfram Buchenberg.
International Conducting Seminar Choir – Marktoberdorf, Germany  2005
International Choir Olympics – Bremen, Germany 2004
ACDA Southern Division Conference, Nashville, Tennessee 2004
First Prize Spiritual/Gospel Category (category winners)
First Prize Chamber Choir Category (category winners)
Fourth Prize Musica Contemporanea Category
Third International Johannes Brahms Choral Competition – Wernigerode, Germany 2003
Gold Diploma, Third Prize in Chamber Choir Category
Gold Diploma, Category winners in Spiritual/Gospel Category

Local events
Locally, the Cardinal Singers perform for a variety of community events on and off campus, ranging from holiday concerts at the Louisville Speed Art Museum and St Martin of Tours Catholic Church for the WUOL Holiday Concert to singing the national anthem at the Louisville Cardinals basketball games.  In February 2004 the Cardinal Singers were selected to perform at the American Choral Directors Association Southern Division Conference in Nashville, Tennessee.  In July 2005 they gave a concert/demonstration for the Kentucky Choral Directors Association Summer Symposium and sang for the conducting session led by Anton Armstrong.  In February 2006, the Cardinal Singers performed at the Kentucky Music Educators Association Conference and received wide acclaim.

See also
 The University of Louisville Collegiate Chorale

External links
 University of Louisville School of Music
 International Federation of Choral Music
 Kentucky Music Educators Association
 American Choral Directors Association

Musical groups established in 1970
University choirs
Cardinal Singers
Choirs in Louisville, Kentucky